A fetish artist is a sculptor, illustrator, or painter who makes fetish art: art related to sexual fetishism and fetishistic acts.

Fetish artists, 1930s–1990s
 Charles Guyette
 John Willie
 Eric Stanton (a.k.a. John Bee, Savage, Stanten)
 Steve Ditko 
 Gene Bilbrew (a.k.a. Eneg, Bondy)
 Hans Bellmer
 Robert Bishop (a.k.a. The Bishop, Ashely)
 Namio Harukawa
 Tom of Finland
 Dom Orejudos (a.k.a. Etienne, Stephen)
 Rex (artist)

Recent fetish artists
 Roberto Baldazzini
 Patrick Conlon
 Drubskin
 Michael Manning 
 Sardax
 Franco Saudelli
 Hajime Sorayama

See also 
 Charles Guyette
 Eric Stanton
 Gene Bilbrew
 Irving Klaw
 John Willie
 History of erotic depictions
 List of BDSM artists

References

External links
 
 Secrets Bdsm Art Online portfolio with many modern fetish artists and photographers, site is online since 2001

Fetish artists